George Mifsud Chircop  (28 June 1951 in Malta – 19 December 2007 in Malta) was a Maltese linguist.  

Mifsud Chircop also studied the folklore and ethnography of his native land.  One of his specialties was the Maltese song genre għana.  The Maltese National Book Council was quoted in the Independent as saying, “Dr Gorg Mifsud Chircop definitely served his country well and deserves the nation's praise.”

Publications
(ed.) The Ritual Year—Proceedings.
Temprinu u Temprina 1-6
Cosolina
Gahan

References

External links
Grixti, Alfred  2007  "Maltese Language Loses One of Its Greats -- George Mifsud Chircop," MalteseStar Issue 506 (December 20).

1951 births
2007 deaths